Shiva Parvati Temple is a Hindu temple located in Kathmandu Durbar Square, Nepal.

It was built by Bahadur Shah, son of Nepal's first king Prithvi Narayan Shah. The temple survived the April 2015 Nepal earthquake.

Gallery

References

External links
 

Hindu temples in Kathmandu District
Kathmandu District
Kathmandu Durbar Square
World Heritage Sites in Nepal
Parvati temples
Shiva temples in Nepal
18th-century establishments in Nepal